Erica Elizabeth Wiebe (born June 13, 1989) is a wrestler competing for Canada. She is an Olympic champion in women's 75 kg freestyle, winning gold at the 2016 Summer Olympics.  She was the third Canadian champion ever in wrestling at the Olympics, and second Canadian woman to win gold after Carol Huynh. Wiebe is also the current Commonwealth Games champion in the same weight class, having won the gold medal at the 2014 and 2018 Commonwealth Games in Glasgow and the Gold Coast, respectively.

Career
Wiebe started wrestling in grade 9 when she saw a sign posted for co-ed wrestling at her school, Sacred Heart High School in Stittsville, Ontario. She travelled as part of Canada's extended team for the 2012 Summer Olympics. There she was the training partner for Leah Callahan in London. At the 2013 World University Games Wiebe won a bronze medal in the women's 72 kg freestyle weight class.

She had an incredibly successful 2014 season when she won every individual tournament she entered, a streak of 36 matches. She won a gold medal in the 75 kg freestyle at the 2014 Commonwealth Games in Glasgow. Celebrating her win after the bout she said "When I won it was emotional. This is what I have been thinking about and dreaming about. It was awesome to have that moment for myself, the first time that I did this at a big event. I have never had my anthem played so I was thinking about that before I went out there and that is what I was wrestling for today." Wiebe would also win gold at the 2015 World University Games. At the esteemed 2015 Golden Grand Prix Ivan Yarygin she won the gold medal in her weight class. Despite the run of successes, Wiebe did not compete for Canada on home soil at the 2015 Pan American Games.

The summer of 2016 saw Wiebe compete as part of Canada's 2016 Olympic team. In competition at the Olympics, she won gold, defeating Guzel Manyurova in the final event. After winning the Olympic title she said "I love this sport and I never thought I'd be an Olympic champion, but today I had my best day. It's amazing."  The medal was the third gold medal in wrestling that Canada has ever won at the Olympics, and second ever women's gold. She follows in the footsteps of Daniel Igali who won gold at the 2000 Summer Olympics, and Carol Huynh who won the first for Canadian women at the 2008 Summer Olympics.

Following her gold in Rio, Wiebe began wrestling in the Indian Pro Wrestling League where she is captain of the Mumbai Maharathi. Wiebe's salary in the league is 4.3 million Indian rupees, which equates to more than $80,000 Canadian dollars, this makes her one of the highest paid wrestlers in the world. The event ran from January 2–19, 2017, where Wiebe wrestled to a perfect 3-0 in her bouts with the Maharathi, though the team's overall record was 1-2.

In 2021, she won the gold medal in the 76 kg event at the Matteo Pellicone Ranking Series 2021 held in Rome, Italy. She also won one of the bronze medals in her event at the 2021 Poland Open held in Warsaw, Poland.

International matches 
{| class="wikitable"
|-
! Res.
! Record
! Opponent
! Score
! Date
! Event
! Location
|-
! style=background:white colspan=8 | 
|-
| Win
| 17-4
| align=left |  Epp Mäe
| style="font-size:88%"|4-0
| style="font-size:88%" |October 24, 2018
| style="font-size:88%" rowspan=4|2018 World Championships
| style="text-align:left;font-size:88%;" rowspan=4|  Budapest
|-
| Loss
| 16-4
| align=left |  Adeline Gray
| style="font-size:88%"|1-3
| style="font-size:88%" rowspan=3|October 23, 2018
|-
| Win
| 16-3
| align=left |  Aline Focken
| style="font-size:88%"|6-4
|-
| Win
| 15-3
| align=left |  Paliha
| style="font-size:88%"|3-0
|-
! style=background:white colspan=8 | 
|-
| Win
| 14-3
| align=left |  Blessing Onyebuchi
| style="font-size:88%"|Fall
| style="font-size:88%" rowspan=3|April 12, 2018
| style="font-size:88%" rowspan=3|2018 Commonwealth Games
| style="text-align:left;font-size:88%;" rowspan=3|  Gold Coast
|-
| Win
| 13-3
| align=left |  Georgina Nelthorpe
| style="font-size:88%"|Tech Fall (11-0)
|-
| Win
| 12-3
| align=left |  Hajaratu Kamara
| style="font-size:88%"|Fall
|-
! style=background:white colspan=8 | 
|-
| Win
| 11-3
| align=left |  Guzel Manyurova
| style="font-size:88%"|6-0
| style="font-size:88%" rowspan=4|August 18, 2016
| style="font-size:88%" rowspan=4|2016 Summer Olympics
| style="text-align:left;font-size:88%;" rowspan=4|  Rio de Janeiro
|-
| Win
| 10-3
| align=left |  Vasilisa Marzaliuk
| style="font-size:88%"|3-0
|-
| Win
| 9-3
| align=left |  Zhang Fengliu
| style="font-size:88%"|5-2
|-
| Win
| 8-3
| align=left |  Epp Mäe
| style="font-size:88%"|6-4
|-
! style=background:white colspan=8 | 
|-
| Loss
| 7-3
| align=left |  Epp Mäe
| style="font-size:88%"|Fall
| style="font-size:88%" rowspan=2| September 11, 2014
| style="font-size:88%" rowspan=2|2014 World Championship
| style="text-align:left;font-size:88%;" rowspan=2|  Tashkent
|-
| Win
| 7-2
| align=left |  Gulmaral Yerkebayeva
| style="font-size:88%"|8-0
|-
! style=background:white colspan=8 | 
|-
| Win
| 6-2
| align=left |  Annabelle Ali
| style="font-size:88%"|4-2
| style="font-size:88%" rowspan=4|April 29, 2014
| style="font-size:88%" rowspan=4|2014 Commonwealth Games
| style="text-align:left;font-size:88%;" rowspan=4|  Glasgow
|-
| Win
| 5-2
| align=left |  Jyoti
| style="font-size:88%"|9-0
|-
| Win
| 4-2
| align=left |  Blessing Onyebuchi
| style="font-size:88%"|Tech Fall (10-0)
|-
| Win
| 3-2
| align=left |  Sophie Edwards
| style="font-size:88%"|Tech Fall (10-0)
|-
! style=background:white colspan=8 | 
|-
| Loss
| 2-2
| align=left |  Ochirbatyn Burmaa
| style="font-size:88%"|3-5
| style="font-size:88%" rowspan=4| September 20, 2013
| style="font-size:88%" rowspan=4|2013 World Championship
| style="text-align:left;font-size:88%;" rowspan=4|  Budapest
|-
| Loss
| 2-1
| align=left |  Natalia Vorobieva
| style="font-size:88%"|Fall
|-
| Win
| 2-0
| align=left |  Jenny Fransson
| style="font-size:88%"|Fall
|-
| Win
| 1-0
| align=left |  Lisset Hechavarría
| style="font-size:88%"|7-0
|-

Wiebe was named flag-bearer for the closing ceremony of the 2018 Commonwealth Games in Gold Coast, Australia.

References

External links
 
 
 
 

1989 births
Living people
Sportspeople from Ottawa
Canadian female sport wrestlers
Wrestlers at the 2014 Commonwealth Games
Commonwealth Games gold medallists for Canada
Olympic wrestlers of Canada
Medalists at the 2016 Summer Olympics
Wrestlers at the 2016 Summer Olympics
World Wrestling Championships medalists
Olympic gold medalists for Canada
Olympic medalists in wrestling
Commonwealth Games medallists in wrestling
Universiade medalists in wrestling
Canadian people of German descent
Wrestlers at the 2018 Commonwealth Games
Universiade gold medalists for Canada
Medalists at the 2013 Summer Universiade
Pan American Wrestling Championships medalists
Wrestlers at the 2020 Summer Olympics
Medallists at the 2014 Commonwealth Games
Medallists at the 2018 Commonwealth Games